Puellae gaditanae (Latin: 'girls from Gades') was the name that, by extension, the ancient Romans gave to all the female dancers from southern Hispania Baetica, whether or not they were from Gades (Cádiz).

History 
The earliest references to the puellae gaditanae are found in Strabo's account of Eudoxus of Cyzicus, who embarked from Cádiz in the 2nd century BC with the aim of circumnavigating Africa, and took young musicians in his crew. It is not known with certainty if they were dancers, singers, instrumentalists or prostitutes, or perhaps all at once.

Martial tells us that after the triumphal entry of Quintus Caecilius Metellus into Rome, after the Sertorian War (around 74 BC), his entourage included some Andalusian girls who danced and who attracted attention for their "mischievous and playful feet" and for their crusmata baetica ("metal castanets"). Elsewhere, Martial highlights the sensual qualities of these dancers and that they sang, murmuring, love songs. The poet Juvenal, a contemporary of Martial, makes similar references, detailing that in their dances they descended towards the ground until they touched it, which was highly applauded by the populace. Other authors state that women from Cadiz cultivated lyric poetry before the Christian era.

In Rome, the dancers from Cadiz were as famous as the Syrian ones and equally desired and exciting in dancing and singing. Their presence was obligatory in many sumptuous feasts at Rome. Martial describes one of them in the following terms:

In Rome shameless dance teachers taught the dances and songs of Cádiz. Martial describes this dance: 

Juvenal confirms this description of Martial by writing: 

Martial invites his friend Toranius to a meal at his house, but warns him that he will not animate the feast with dancers from Gades: 

Humming in Rome licentious songs from Egypt or Gades, which made Gades dancers fashionable, was proof of being effeminate, according to Martial:

Martial gives the name and performance of one of these dancers from Gades; she was called Telethusa. She is described in one epigram, and he dedicates other epigrams to her. Martial awaits the arrival of Telethusa to drink in her company:

Historiography 
Some writers have suggested a connection between the survival and flourishing of the puellae gaditanae in the Roman world and the broader institution of sacred prostitution that formed around the cult of the Phoenician Astarte, the Greek Aphrodite and the Roman Venus. Joaquín Costa in his book Las juglaresas gaditanas en el Imperio Romano dates them to an earlier date, locating their origin in the "noisy choirs and dances with which the Bastetani celebrated their tribal or family festivals".

See also 

 Hetaira
 Soldadeira
 Flamenco

Notes

References

Sources

Primary 

 Anonymous (1868). The Index Expurgatorius of Martial. London: Printed for Private Circulation. pp. 138–139.
 Jones, Horace Leonard (1917). The Geography of Strabo I. London: William Heinemann; New York: G. P. Putnam's Sons. pp. 380–381.
 Ker, Walter C. A. (1919). Martial: Epigrams I. London: William Heinemann; New York: G. P. Putnam's Sons. pp. 202–203, 349–351, 404–405.
 Ker, Walter C. A. (1920). Martial: Epigrams II. London: William Heinemann; New York: G. P. Putnam's Sons. pp. 38–41, 282–285, 510–511.
 Melmoth, William; Hutchinson, W. M. L. (1905). Pliny: Letters I. London: William Heinemann; New York: The Macmillan Co. pp. 52–53.
 Ramsay, G. G. (1928). Juvenal and Persius. London: William Heinemann; New York: G. P. Putnam's Sons. pp. 232–233.

Secondary 

 Calero, Luis; Bernard, Gaël (January 2014). «Las puellae gaditanae, una coreografía con acento propio». Anas, 27: pp. 107–120. 
 Colubi Falcó, J. M. (1999). «Condición social jurídica de la puella gaditana». HABIS, 30: pp. 307–314.
 Fear, A. T. (April 1991). "The Dancing Girls of Cadiz". Greece & Rome, 38(1): 75–79.
 Mayorga González, Antonio (December 2009). «Nuestros remotos antepasados: mastienos-Bastetanos y Fenicios». Isla de Arriarán, 34: pp. 47–57.
 Miravelles, Luis (2007). «La tradición oral: de la lírica popular al cante flamenco». Revista de Folklore, 315. Fundación Joaquín Díaz.
 Olmos, Ricardo (30 December 1991). ««Puellae Gaditanae»: ¿Heteras de Astarté?». Archivo Español de Arqueología, 64(163–164): pp. 99–109.

Prostitution in ancient Rome
Women in ancient Rome
Hispania Baetica
Astarte